Freddie Phillip Hyatt (born June 28, 1946 in Roanoke, Alabama; died June 27, 2022) was an American football wide receiver in the National Football League for the St. Louis Cardinals, the New Orleans Saints, and the Washington Redskins.  He played college football at Auburn University and was drafted by the Cardinals in the second round of the 1968 NFL Draft. Hyatt died of open heart surgery in Ocala, Florida just one day before his 76th birthday.

References

1946 births
2022 deaths
American football wide receivers
Auburn Tigers football players
Players of American football from Alabama
People from Roanoke, Alabama
St. Louis Cardinals (football) players
New Orleans Saints players
Washington Redskins players